René Bianchi (born 20 May 1934) is a French former cyclist. He competed at the 1956 Summer Olympics, winning a silver medal in the team pursuit event.

References

External links
 

1934 births
Living people
French male cyclists
Olympic cyclists of France
Cyclists at the 1956 Summer Olympics
Sportspeople from Marne (department)
Olympic silver medalists for France
Olympic medalists in cycling
Medalists at the 1956 Summer Olympics
French track cyclists
Cyclists from Grand Est